The Pillsbury State Forest is a state forest located in Cass County, Minnesota. Created in 1900, it was the first designated Minnesota state forests. The forest borders Gull Lake and the city of Lake Shore to the north. The forest is managed by the Minnesota Department of Natural Resources. The name of the forest is derived from John S. Pillsbury, the former Governor of Minnesota, who donated the original  of land that became the state forest.

History and overview
Millions of board feet of old-growth eastern white pine and red pine were harvested in the area in the late 19th century, with the intention of turning the land into farmsteads. Many farms were abandoned when the land turned out to be unsuitable for agriculture.

Wildlife
Wildlife is abundant in the forest. Mammals such as white-tailed deer, American black bears, gray wolves, and eastern gray squirrels are common. Bird species in the forest include the red-shouldered hawk, ruffed grouse bald eagles, ospreys, and waterfowl (including mallards and wood ducks); rookeries of the great blue heron also are present in the forest, as are wild turkeys who have migrated from nearby Camp Ripley.

Recreation
Popular outdoor recreational activities in the forest are largely centered on the abundance of waterbodies in the forest, and include swimming, fishing, canoeing, kayaking, and boating. Trails are designated for a variety of uses, and include  set aside for mountain biking and horseback riding, and  specifically for hiking. In the wintertime,  are designated for cross-country skiing.

See also
List of Minnesota state forests

References

External links
Pillsbury State Forest - Minnesota Department of Natural Resources (DNR)

Minnesota state forests
Protected areas of Cass County, Minnesota
Protected areas established in 1900